S-Allylcysteine (SAC) is an organosulfur compound that is a constituent of fresh garlic.  It is a derivative of the amino acid cysteine in which an allyl group replaces the proton on sulfur.  A number of related compounds are found in garlic, including the disulfide S-"allylmercaptocysteine" (SAMC) and γ-glutamyl-S-allylcysteine" (GSAC).

Allylcysteine is of interest for its potential medicinal properties. and as a chemopreventive.

See also
 Alliin, the S-oxide of allyl cysteine

References

External links
 S-allyl-laevo-cysteine, thegoodscentscompany.com

Sulfur amino acids
Antioxidants
Thioethers
Allyl compounds